The 59th edition of the KNVB Cup started on October 10, 1976. The final was played on May 19, 1977: FC Twente beat PEC Zwolle 3–0 (after extra time) and won the cup for the first time.

Teams
 All 18 participants of the Eredivisie 1976-77, entering in the second round
 All 19 participants of the Eerste Divisie 1976-77
 9 teams from lower (amateur) leagues

First round
The matches of the first round were played on October 10, 1976.

1 Eerste Divisie; A Amateur teams

Second round
The matches of the second round were played on November 21, 1976. The Eredivisie clubs entered the tournament this round.

E Eredivisie

Round of 16
The matches of the round of 16 were played between February 16 and 20, 1977.

Quarter finals
The quarter finals were played on March 9, 1977.

Semi-finals
The semi-finals were played on April 27, 1977.

Final

FC Twente would play in the Cup Winners' Cup.

See also
Eredivisie 1976-77
Eerste Divisie 1976-77

References

External links
 Netherlands Cup Full Results 1970–1994 by the RSSSF

1976-77
1976–77 domestic association football cups
KNVB Cup